The spot-crowned antvireo (Dysithamnus puncticeps) is a species of bird in the family Thamnophilidae. It is found in Colombia, Costa Rica, Ecuador, and Panama. Its natural habitat is subtropical or tropical moist lowland forests.

References

External links
Xeno-canto: audio recordings of the spot-crowned antvireo
Image at ADW

spot-crowned antvireo
Birds of Panama
Birds of the Tumbes-Chocó-Magdalena
spot-crowned antvireo
spot-crowned antvireo
Taxonomy articles created by Polbot